St. Francis Hospital may refer to:

Canada
St. Francis Memorial Hospital, Barry's Bay, Ontario

Uganda
St. Francis Hospital Nsambya, Kampala, Uganda

United Kingdom
St Francis Hospital, Haywards Heath

United States
CHI Health St. Francis (Grand Island, Nebraska)
St. Francis Hospital, Charleston, West Virginia
St. Francis Hospital (Cincinnati, Ohio)
St. Francis Hospital (Colorado Springs, Colorado)
St. Francis Hospital (Columbus, Georgia)
Saint Francis Hospital of Evanston, Evanston, Illinois
St. Francis Hospital, Federal Way, Washington
St. Francis Hospital (Flower Hill, New York), sometimes listed as Roslyn, New York
St. Francis Hospital & Health Centers, Greater Indianapolis, Indiana
Saint Francis Hospital & Medical Center, Hartford, Connecticut
St. Francis Hospital, Litchfield, Illinois
Saint Francis Memorial Hospital, San Francisco, California
St. Francis Hospital, Wilmington, Delaware
St. Francis Hospital, Oklahoma (see Warren Clinic shooting)

Historical
St. Francis Hospital of The Sisters Of The Poor Of St. Francis, New York City, New York (1865-1966)
St. Francis Hospital, Pittsburgh, Pennsylvania (1865–2002)

See also
St. Francis Medical Center (disambiguation)